Aghbolagh-e Kalisa Kandi (also Romanized as Āghbolāgh-e Kalīsā Kandī; also known as Āghbolāgh and Āqbolāgh) is a village in Avajiq-e Shomali Rural District, Dashtaki District, Chaldoran County, West Azerbaijan Province, Iran. At the 2006 census, its population was 80, in 20 families.

References 

Populated places in Chaldoran County